Elias Florence (February 15, 1797 – November 21, 1880) was a U.S. Representative from Ohio.

Born in Fauquier County, Virginia, he attended the public schools and studied agriculture. He later moved to Ohio and settled in Circleville, Pickaway County. He served as member of the Ohio House of Representatives in 1829, 1830, 1834, and 1840, and served in the Ohio Senate in 1835.

He was elected as a Whig to the Twenty-eighth Congress (March 4, 1843 – March 3, 1845). In 1850, he served as member of the state constitutional convention. Thereafter he resumed agricultural pursuits. He died in Muhlenberg Township, Ohio, November 21, 1880 and was interred in Forest Cemetery in Circleville.

References

1797 births
1880 deaths
People from Circleville, Ohio
People from Fauquier County, Virginia
Ohio Constitutional Convention (1850)
Members of the Ohio House of Representatives
Ohio state senators
Whig Party members of the United States House of Representatives from Ohio
19th-century American politicians